Mukim Burong Pingai Ayer is a mukim in Brunei-Muara District, Brunei. It is located within Kampong Ayer, the traditional stilt settlements on the Brunei River in the capital Bandar Seri Begawan. The population was 1,770 in 2016.

Name 
The mukim is named after Kampong Burong Pingai Ayer, one of the villages it encompasses.

Geography 
The mukim borders Mukim Sungai Kedayan to the north, Mukim Peramu and Mukim Sungai Kebun to the east, Mukim Lumapas to the south, Mukim Kianggeh to the west and Mukim Tamoi to the west and north-west.

Demographics 
As of 2016 census, the population of Mukim Burong Pingai Ayer comprised 889 males and 881 females. The mukim had 264 households occupying 264 dwellings. The entire population lived in urban areas.

Villages 
As of 2016, the mukim comprised the following census villages:

Facilities

Mosques 
 Pehin Datu Imam Haji Abdul Mokti Mosque
It was built in 1992 and can accommodate 300 worshippers.

Notes

References 

Burong Pingai Ayer
Brunei-Muara District